Oxford College may refer to:

University of Oxford, collegiate research university located in Oxford, England
Colleges of the University of Oxford
 There are various institutions in Oxford that use the phrase "Oxford College" in their name, but have no connections with the University
Oxford College of Emory University in Oxford, Georgia, USA
Aletheia University, private university in Tamsui, Taiwan, formerly Oxford (University) College
Oxford College (previously known as the Oxford Female Institute) former women's college now merged with Miami University in Oxford, Ohio

See also
 Oxford University (disambiguation)
 Oxford University College (disambiguation)
 Oxford School (disambiguation)
 Oxford High School (disambiguation)
 Oxford Academy (disambiguation)